The Ugashik Lakes are two adjacent lakes along the Ugashik River on the Alaska Peninsula in the U.S. state of Alaska.

The lakes are world-renowned for trophy Arctic grayling fishing. The lakes also support large concentrations of lake trout, provide key feeding habitat for large numbers of sockeye and coho salmon.

Lakes of Alaska
Lakes of Lake and Peninsula Borough, Alaska